Instituto Escuela can refer to:
 Instituto Escuela del Sur, a private middle school and high school in Tlalpan, Mexico City
 U.E. Instituto Escuela (Caracas)
 Instituto Escuela (Madrid)